The 22nd Venice Biennale, held in 1940, was an exhibition of international contemporary art, with 12 participating nations. The Venice Biennale takes place biennially in Venice, Italy. Winners of the Gran Premi (Grand Prize) included Hungarian painter Vilmos Aba Novàk, German sculptor Arno Breker, Belgian etcher Maurice Brocas, and Italians painter Felice Carena, sculptor Guido Galletti, and etcher Marcello Boglione.

References

Bibliography

Further reading 

 
 
 

1940 in art
1940 in Italy
Venice Biennale exhibitions